The Hongwu Emperor (21 October 1328 – 24 June 1398), personal name Zhu Yuanzhang, courtesy name Guorui, was the founding emperor of the Ming dynasty of China, reigning from 1368 to 1398.

As famine, plagues and peasant revolts increased across China proper in the 14th century, Zhu Yuanzhang rose to command the Red Turban forces that conquered China proper, ending the Mongol-led Yuan dynasty and forcing the remnant Yuan court (known as Northern Yuan in historiography) to retreat to the Mongolian Plateau. Zhu claimed the Mandate of Heaven and established the Ming dynasty at the beginning of 1368 and occupied the Yuan capital, Khanbaliq (present-day Beijing), with his army that same year. Trusting only his family, he made his many sons feudal princes along the northern marches and the Yangtze valley. Having outlived his eldest son Zhu Biao, Zhu enthroned Zhu Biao's son via a series of instructions. This ended in failure when the Jianwen Emperor's attempts to unseat his uncles led to the Jingnan Rebellion.

The era of Hongwu was noted for its tolerance of minorities and religions;  Ma Zhou, the Chinese historian, indicates that the Hongwu ordered the renovation and construction of many mosques in Xi’an and Nanjing. Wang Daiyu also recorded that the emperor wrote 100 characters praising Islam, Baizi zan.

The reign of the Hongwu Emperor is notable for his unprecedented political reforms. The emperor abolished the position of chancellor, drastically reduced the role of court eunuchs, and adopted draconian measures to address corruption. He also established the Embroidered Uniform Guard, one of the best known secret police organizations in imperial China. In the 1380s and 1390s a series of purges were launched to eliminate his high-ranked officials and generals; tens of thousands were executed. The reign of Hongwu also witnessed much cruelty. Various cruel methods of execution were introduced for punishable crimes and for those who directly criticized the emperor, and massacres were also carried out against everyone who resisted his rule.

The emperor encouraged agriculture, reduced taxes, incentivized the cultivation of new land, and established laws protecting peasants' property. He also confiscated land held by large estates and forbade private slavery. At the same time, he banned free movement in the empire and assigned hereditary occupational categories to households. Through these measures, Zhu Yuanzhang attempted to rebuild a country that had been ravaged by war, limit and control its social groups, and instill orthodox values in his subjects, eventually creating a strictly regimented society of self-sufficient farming communities.

Early life 
Zhu was born to a family of impoverished peasant tenant farmers in Zhongli County in the Huai River plain, which is in present-day Fengyang, Anhui Province. His father's name was Zhu Shizhen (朱世珍, original name Zhu Wusi 朱五四) and his mother was Chen Erniang. He had seven older siblings, several of whom were "given away" by his parents, as they not always had enough food to support the family. When he was 16, severe drought ruined the harvest where his family lived and famine subsequently killed everyone in his family except for him and one of his brothers. He then buried them by wrapping them in white cloth.

His grandfather, who lived to be 99 years old, had served in the Southern Song army and navy, which had fought against the Mongol invasion, and told his grandson tales of it.

Destitute after his family's death, Zhu accepted a suggestion to take up a pledge made by his brother and became a novice monk at the Huangjue Temple, a local Buddhist monastery. However, he was forced to leave the monastery after it ran short of funds.

For the next few years, Zhu led the life of a wandering beggar and personally experienced the hardships of the common people in late years of Yuan dynasty. After about three years, he returned to the monastery and stayed there until he was around 24 years old. He learned to read and write during the time that he spent with the Buddhist monks.

Rise to power 

The monastery where Zhu lived was eventually looted and destroyed by an army whose task was supposedly to suppress a local rebellion. In 1352, Zhu joined one of the many insurgent forces that had risen in rebellion against the Mongol-led Yuan dynasty. He rose rapidly through the ranks and became a commander. His rebel force later joined the Red Turbans (then led by Han Shantong), a millenarian sect related to the White Lotus Society, and one that followed cultural and religious traditions of Buddhism, Manichaeism and other religions. Widely seen as a defender of Confucianism and neo-Confucianism among the predominant Han population in China proper, Zhu emerged as a leader of the rebels that were struggling to overthrow the Yuan dynasty.

In 1356, Zhu and his army conquered Nanjing, which became his base of operations and later the capital of the Ming dynasty during his reign. Zhu's government in Nanjing became famous for good governance, and the city attracted vast numbers of people fleeing from other more lawless regions. It is estimated that Nanjing's population increased tenfold over the next 10 years. In the meantime, the Yuan government had been weakened by internal factions fighting for control, and it made little effort to retake the Yangtze River valley. By 1358, central and Southern China had fallen into the hands of different rebel groups. During that time the Red Turbans also split up. Zhu became the leader of a smaller faction (called "Wu" around 1360), while the larger faction, under Chen Youliang, controlled the center of the Yangtze River valley.

Zhu Yuanzhang was the Duke of Wu, which was nominally under the control of Han Shantong's son Han Lin'er, who was enthroned as the Longfeng Emperor of the Song dynasty.

Zhu was able to attract many talents into his service. One of them was Zhu Sheng, who advised him to "build high walls, stock up rations, and delay claiming kingship". Another, Jiao Yu, was an artillery officer, who later compiled a military treatise outlining the various types of gunpowder weapons. Another one, Liu Bowen, became one of Zhu's key advisors, and edited the military-technology treatise titled Huolongjing in later years.

Beginning in 1360, Zhu and Chen Youliang fought a protracted war for supremacy over the former territories controlled by the Red Turbans. The pivotal moment in the war was the Battle of Lake Poyang in 1363. The battle lasted three days and ended with the defeat and retreat of Chen's larger navy. Chen died a month later in battle. Zhu did not participate personally in any battles after that and remained in Nanjing, where he directed his generals to go on campaigns.

In 1367, Zhu's forces defeated Zhang Shicheng's Wu regime, which was centered in Suzhou and had previously included most of the Yangtze River Delta, and Hangzhou, which was formerly the capital of the Song dynasty. This victory granted Zhu's government authority over the lands north and south of the Yangtze River. The other major warlords surrendered to Zhu and on 23 January 1368, Zhu proclaimed himself emperor of the Ming dynasty in Nanjing and adopted "Hongwu" (lit. "vastly martial") as his era name.

In 1368, Ming armies headed north to attack territories that were still under Yuan rule. Toghon Temür (Emperor Shun of Yuan) gave up his capital, Khanbaliq (present-day Beijing), and the rest of northern China in September 1368 and retreated to the Mongolian Plateau. On 15 October 1371, one of Hongwu's sons, Zhu Shuang, was married to the sister of Köke Temür, a Bayad general of the Yuan dynasty.

In 1371, the Ming dynasty defeated the Ming Xia dynasty founded by Ming Yuzhen, which ruled Sichuan.

The Ming army captured the last Yuan-controlled province of Yunnan in 1381, and China proper was unified under Ming rule.

Reign 

Under Hongwu's rule, Mongol and other foreign bureaucrats who had dominated the government during the Yuan dynasty along with Northern Chinese officials were replaced by Han Chinese officials. The emperor re-instituted, then abolished, then restored, the Confucian civil service imperial examination system, from which most state officials were selected based on their knowledge of literature and philosophy. The Ming examination curriculum followed that set by the Yuan in 1313: a focus on the Four Books over the Five Classics and the commentaries of Zhu Xi. The Confucian scholar-bureaucrats who had been previously marginalized during the Yuan dynasty were reinstated to their predominant roles in the government.

"Barbarian" (i.e. Mongol-related) elements, including garments and names, were made illegal. There was no clear definition on what was "barbarian", and individual clothing styles and names were banned at the emperor’s will. There were also attacks on palaces and administrative buildings previously used by the rulers of the Yuan dynasty. But many of Taizu's government institutions were actually modeled on those of the Yuan dynasty: community schools required for primary education in every village.

Ming's legal system established by Hongwu contains various methods of execution including flaying, and slow slicing. One of his generals, Chang Yuchun, carried out massacres in Shandong and Hunan provinces to take revenge against people who resisted his army. Over time, Hongwu became increasingly fearful of rebellions and coups, and also ordered the execution of those of his advisors who criticized him. Manicheanism and the White Lotus Sect, which played significant roles during the revolts against the Yuan, were outlawed. He was also said to have ordered the massacre of several thousand people living in Nanjing after having heard one talked about him without respect. In the Hu Weiyong case alone, tens of thousands of officials and their families were executed over sedition, treason, corruption and other charges. According to an anecdote noted by Ming dynasty writers, in 1380, after much killing, a lightning bolt struck his palace and he stopped the massacres for some time, as he was afraid divine forces would punish him. In the 1390s, however, tens of thousands more people were executed due to their association with an alleged plot of rebellion by general Lan Yu.

When the Ming dynasty emerged, Hongwu's military officers were given noble titles. These privileged the holder with a stipend, but in all other aspects was merely symbolic. Mu Ying's family was among them. Special rules against abuse of power were implemented on the nobles.

Land reforms 
As Hongwu came from a peasant family, he was aware of how peasants used to suffer under the oppression of the scholar-bureaucrats, and the wealthy. Many of the latter, relying on their connections with government officials, encroached unscrupulously on peasants' lands and bribed the officials to transfer the burden of taxation to the poor. To prevent such abuse, he instituted two systems: Yellow Records and Fish Scale Records. They served both to secure the government's income from land taxes and to affirm that peasants would not lose their lands.

However, the reforms did not eliminate the threat of the bureaucrats to peasants. Instead, the expansion of the bureaucrats and their growing prestige translated into more wealth, and tax exemption for those in the government service. The bureaucrats gained new privileges, and some became illegal money-lenders and managers of gambling rings. Using their power, the bureaucrats expanded their estates at the expense of peasants' lands through outright purchase of those lands, and foreclosure on their mortgages whenever they wanted the lands. The peasants often became either tenants, or workers, or sought employment elsewhere.

Since the beginning of the Ming dynasty in 1357, great care was taken by Hongwu to distribute land to peasants. One way was by forced migration to less-dense areas. Hongtong County, for example, was the source of many of those migrants due to its particularly dense population. The migrants were gathered under a pagoda tree and escorted to neighboring provinces. "The great pagoda tree in Hongtong, Shanxi" became a common idiom when referring to one's ancestral home in certain areas of Henan and Hebei. Public works projects, such as the construction of irrigation systems, and dikes, were undertaken in an attempt to help farmers. In addition, Hongwu also reduced the demands for forced labor on the peasantry.

In 1370, Hongwu ordered that some lands in Hunan and Anhui should be given to young farmers who had reached adulthood. The order was intended to prevent landlords from seizing the land, as it also decreed that the titles to the lands were not transferable. During the middle part of his reign, he passed an edict, stating that those who brought fallow land under cultivation could keep it as their property without being taxed. The policy was well received by the people and in 1393, cultivated land rose to 8,804,623 qing and 68 mu, something not achieved during any other Chinese dynasty. Hongwu also instigated the planting of 50 million trees in the vicinity of Nanjing, reconstructing canals, irrigation, and repopulation of the North.

Social policy
Under the Hongwu reign, rural China was reorganized into li, communities of 110 households. The position of community chief rotates among the ten most populous households, while the rest were further divided into tithings (jia, 甲). Together, the system was known as lijia. The communities were responsible for collecting tax and drafting labor for the local government. Village elders were also obliged to keep surveillance on the community, report criminal activities, and ensure that the residents are fully committed to agricultural work.

The Yuan dynasty Zhuse Huji system was continued and the households were categorized into different types. The most basic types, namely civilian households, military households, craftsmen households and salt worker households, defined the family's form of corvée labor. Military households, for example, accounted for around one-sixth of the total population at the beginning of the Yongle era, and each was required to provide an adult man as soldier, and at least one more person to work in support roles in the military. The military, craftsmen and salt worker households were hereditary, and converting into civilian households was impossible except in a few very rare situations. A family may simultaneously belong in one of the minor categories, e.g. physician households and scholar households, according to their occupation. In addition to the aforementioned "good" households, discriminatory types also existed, such as entertainer households.

Travelers were required to carry a luyin, a permit issued by the local government, and their neighbors were required to have knowledge of their itinerary. Unauthorized domestic migration was banned, and offenders were exiled. The policy was strictly enforced during the Hongwu era.

Zhu Yuanzhang passed a law on mandatory hairstyle on 24 September 1392, mandating that all males grow their hair long and making it illegal for them to shave part of their foreheads while leaving strands of hair which was the Mongol hairstyle. The penalty for both the barber and the person who was shaved and his sons was castration if they cut their hair and their families were to be sent to the borders for exile. This helped eradicated partially shaved Mongol hairstyles and enforced long Han hairstyle.

Military 

The Hongwu Emperor realized that the Northern Yuan still posed a threat to the Ming dynasty, even though they had been driven away after the collapse of the Yuan dynasty. He decided to reassess the orthodox Confucian view that the military class was inferior to that of the scholar bureaucracy. He kept a powerful army, which in 1384 he reorganized using a model known as the weisuo system. Each military unit consisted of 5,600 men divided into five battalions and ten companies. By 1393 the total number of weisuo troops had reached 1,200,000. Soldiers were also assigned land on which to grow crops whilst their positions were made hereditary. This type of system can be traced back to the fubing system of the Sui and Tang dynasties.

Training was conducted within local military districts. In times of war, troops were mobilized from all over the empire on the orders of the Ministry of War, and commanders were appointed to lead them to battle. After the war, the army was disbanded into smaller groups and sent back to their respective districts, while the commanders had to return their authority to the state. This system helped to prevent military leaders from having too much power. The military was under the control of a civilian official for large campaigns, instead of a military general.

Bureaucratic reforms and consolidation of power 

Hongwu attempted, and largely succeeded in, the consolidation of control over all aspects of government, so that no other group could gain enough power to overthrow him. He also buttressed the country's defense against the Mongols. He increasingly concentrated power in his own hands. He abolished the Chancellor's post, which had been head of the main central administrative body under past dynasties, by suppressing a plot for which he had blamed his chancellor Hu Weiyong. Many argue that Hongwu, because of his wish to concentrate absolute authority in his own hands, removed the only insurance against incompetent emperors.

However, Hongwu could not govern the sprawling Ming Empire all by himself and had to create the new institution of the "Grand Secretary". This cabinet-like organisation progressively took on the powers of the abolished prime minister, becoming just as powerful in time. Ray Huang argued that Grand-Secretaries, outwardly powerless, could exercise considerable positive influence from behind the throne. Because of their prestige and the public trust which they enjoyed, they could act as intermediaries between the emperor and the ministerial officials, and thus provide a stabilising force in the court.

In Hongwu's elimination of the traditional offices of grand councilor, the primary impetus was Hu Weiyong's alleged attempt to usurp the throne. Hu was the Senior Grand Councilor and a capable administrator; however over the years, the magnitude of his powers, as well as involvement in several political scandals eroded the paranoid emperor's trust in him. Finally, in 1380, Hongwu had Hu and his entire family arrested and executed on charges of treason. Using this as an opportunity to purge his government, the emperor also ordered the execution of countless other officials, as well as their families, for associating with Hu. The purge lasted over a decade and resulted in more than 30,000 executions. In 1390, even Li Shanchang, one of the closest old friends of the emperor, who was rewarded as the biggest contributor to the founding of the Ming Empire, was executed along with over 70 members of his extended family. A year after his death, a deputy in the Board of Works made a submission to the emperor appealing Li's innocence, arguing that since Li was already at the apex of honour, wealth and power, the accusation that he wanted to help someone else usurp the throne was clearly ridiculous. Hongwu was unable to refute the accusations and finally ended the purge shortly afterwards.

Hongwu also noted the destructive role of court eunuchs under the previous dynasties. He drastically reduced their numbers, forbidding them to handle documents, insisting that they remain illiterate, and executing those who commented on state affairs. The emperor had a strong aversion to the eunuchs, epitomized by a tablet in his palace stipulating: "Eunuchs must have nothing to do with the administration". This aversion to eunuchs did not long continue among his successors, as the Hongwu and Jianwen emperors' harsh treatment of eunuchs allowed the Yongle Emperor to employ them as a power base during his coup. In addition to Hongwu's aversion to eunuchs, he never consented to any of his consort kin becoming court officials. This policy was fairly well-maintained by later emperors, and no serious trouble was caused by the empresses or their families.

The Embroidered Uniform Guard or Jinyiwei was transformed into a secret police organization during the Hongwu era. It was given the authority to overrule judicial proceedings in prosecutions with full autonomy in arresting, interrogating and punishing anyone, including nobles and the emperor's relatives. In 1393, Jiang Huan, the chief of Jinyiwei, accused general Lan Yu of plotting rebellion. 15,000 people was executed in familial extermination during the subsequent purges, according to Hongwu.

Through the repeated purges and the elimination of the historical posts, Hongwu fundamentally altered the centuries-old government structure of China, greatly increasing the emperor's absolutism.

Legal reforms 

The legal code drawn up in the time of Hongwu was considered one of the great achievements of the era. The History of Ming mentioned that as early as 1364, the monarchy had started to draft a code of laws. This code was known as Da Ming Lü ("Code of the Great Ming" or "Laws of the Great Ming"). The emperor devoted much time to the project and instructed his ministers that the code should be comprehensive and intelligible, so as not to allow any official to exploit loopholes in the code by deliberately misinterpreting it. The Ming code laid much emphasis on family relations. The code was a great improvement on the code of the Tang dynasty in regards to the treatment of slaves. Under the Tang code, slaves were treated as a species of domestic animal; if they were killed by a free citizen, the law imposed no sanction on the killer. Under the Ming dynasty, the law protected both slaves and free citizens.

Later during his reign, however, the Code of the Great Ming was set aside in favor of the far harsher legal system documented in Da Gao (大誥, "Great Announcements"). Compared to the Da Ming Lü, the penalties for almost all crimes were drastically increased, with more than 1,000 crimes eligible for capital punishment. Much of the Da Gao was dedicated to the government and officials, particularly for anti-corruption. Officials who embezzled more than the equivalent of 60 liang (one liang was around 30 grams) of silver were to be beheaded and then flayed, the skin publicly exhibited. Zhu Yuanzhang granted all people the right to capture officials suspected of crimes and directly send them to the capital, a first in Chinese history. Apart from regulating the government, Da Gao aimed to set limits to various social groups. For example, "idle men" who did not change their lifestyles after the new law came into effect would be executed and their neighbors exiled. Da Gao also included extensive sumptuary laws, down to details such as banning ornaments in heating rooms in the houses of commoners.

Economic policy 
Supported by the scholar-bureaucrats, he accepted the Confucian viewpoint that merchants were solely parasitic. He felt that agriculture should be the country's source of wealth and that trade was ignoble. As a result, the Ming economic system emphasized agriculture, unlike the economic system of the Song dynasty, which had preceded the Yuan dynasty and relied on traders and merchants for revenues. Hongwu also supported the creation of self-supporting agricultural communities.

However, his prejudice against merchants did not diminish the numbers of traders. On the contrary, commerce increased significantly during the Hongwu era because of the growth of industry throughout the empire. This growth in trade was due in part to poor soil conditions and the overpopulation of certain areas, which forced many people to leave their homes and seek their fortunes in trade. A book titled Tu Pien Hsin Shu, written during the Ming dynasty, gave a detailed description of the activities of merchants at that time.

Although the Hongwu era saw the reintroduction of paper currency, its development was stifled from the beginning. Not understanding inflation, Hongwu gave out so much paper money as rewards that by 1425, the state was forced to restore copper coins because the paper currency had sunk to only 1/70 of its original value.

Education policy 

Hongwu tried to remove Mencius from the Temple of Confucius as certain parts of his work were deemed harmful. These include "the people are the most important element in a nation; the spirits of the land and grain are the next; the sovereign is the lightest" (Mengzi, Jin Xin II), as well as, "when the prince regards the ministers as the ground or as grass, they regard him as a robber and an enemy" (Mengzi, Li Lou II). The effort failed due to the objection from important officials, particularly Qian Tang, Minister of Justice. Eventually, the emperor organized the compilation of the Mencius Abridged in which 85 lines were deleted. Apart from those mentioned above, the omitted sentences also included those describing rules of governance, promoting benevolence, and those critical of King Zhou of Shang.

At the Guozijian, law, math, calligraphy, equestrianism, and archery were emphasized by Hongwu in addition to Confucian classics and also required in the Imperial Examinations. Archery and equestrianism were added to the exam by Hongwu in 1370, similarly to how archery and equestrianism were required for non-military officials at the College of War in 1162 by Emperor Xiaozong of Song. The area around the Meridian Gate of Nanjing was used for archery by guards and generals under Hongwu.
A cavalry based army modeled on the Yuan military was implemented by the Hongwu and Yongle Emperors. Hongwu's army and officialdom incorporated Mongols.

Equestrianism and archery were favorite pastimes of He Suonan who served in the Yuan and Ming militaries under Hongwu. Archery towers were built by Zhengtong Emperor at the Forbidden City and archery towers were built on the city walls of Xi'an which had been erected by Hongwu.

Hongwu wrote essays which were posted in every village throughout China warning the people to behave or else face horrifying consequences. The 1380s writings of Hongwu includes the "Great warnings" or "Grand Pronouncements", and the "Ancestral Injunctions". He wrote the Six Maxims (六諭, 聖諭六言) which inspired the Sacred Edict of the Kangxi Emperor.

Around 1384, Hongwu ordered the Chinese translation and compilation of Islamic astronomical tables, a task that was carried out by the scholars Mashayihei, a Muslim astronomer, and Wu Bozong, a Chinese scholar-official. These tables came to be known as the Huihui Lifa (Muslim System of Calendrical Astronomy), which was published in China a number of times until the early 18th century,

Religious policy 

Mongol and Central Asian Semu Muslim women and men were required by the Code of the Great Ming to marry Han Chinese after the first Ming emperor Hongwu passed the law in Article 122.

Hongwu ordered the construction of several mosques in Nanjing, Yunnan, Guangdong and Fujian provinces, and had inscriptions praising the Islamic prophet Muhammad placed in them. He rebuilt the Jinjue Mosque (literally meaning: Pure Enlightenment Mosque) in Nanjing and large numbers of Hui people moved to the city during his rule.

Foreign policy 

Hongwu designated the "country without conquest". He listed 15 countries that Ming would not attempt to conquest, such as Japan, Srivijaya, Siam, Lewchew  and An Nan.

Vietnam 
Hongwu was a non-interventionist, refusing to intervene in a Vietnamese invasion of Champa to help the Chams, only rebuking the Vietnamese for their invasion, being opposed to military action abroad. He specifically warned future emperors only to defend against foreign barbarians, and not engage in expansionist military campaigns for glory and conquest. In his 1395 ancestral injunctions, the emperor specifically wrote that China should not attack Champa, Cambodia or Annam (Vietnam). With the exception of his turn against aggressive expansion, much of Hongwu's foreign policy and his diplomatic institutions were based on Yuan practice.

"Japanese" pirates 

Hongwu sent a message to the Japanese that his army would "capture and exterminate your bandits, head straight for your country, and put your king in bonds". In fact, many of the "dwarf pirates" and "eastern barbarians" raiding his coasts were Chinese, and Hongwu's response was almost entirely passive. The Ashikaga shōgun replied "Your great empire may be able to invade Japan, but our small state is not short of a strategy to defend ourselves." The necessity of protecting his state against the Northern Yuan remnants meant that the most Hongwu was able to accomplish against Japan was a series of "sea ban" measures. Private foreign trade was made punishable by death, with the trader's family and neighbors exiled; ships, docks, and shipyards were destroyed, and ports were sabotaged. The plan was at odds with Chinese tradition and was counterproductive as it tied up resources. 74 coastal garrisons had to be established from Guangzhou to Shandong, though they were often manned by local gangs. Hongwu's measures limited tax receipts, impoverished and provoked both coastal Chinese and Japanese against the Hongwu regime, and actually increased piracy- offering too little as a reward for good behavior and enticement for Japanese authorities to root out their own smugglers and pirates. Regardless of the policy, piracy had dropped to negligible levels by the time of its abolition in 1568.

Nonetheless, the sea ban was added by Hongwu to his Ancestral Injunctions and so continued to be broadly enforced through most of the rest of his dynasty: for the next two centuries, the rich farmland of the south and the military theaters of the north were linked only by the Jinghang Canal.

Despite the deep distrust, in Hongwu's Ancestral Injunctions, he listed Japan along with 14 other countries as "countries against which campaigns shall not be launched", and advised his descendants to maintain peace with them. This policy was violated by his son Yongle Emperor who ordered multiple interventions in Annam (present-day northern Vietnam), but remained influential for several centuries afterwards.

Byzantine Empire 

The History of Ming, compiled during the early Qing dynasty, describes how Hongwu met with an alleged merchant of Fulin (拂菻; the Byzantine Empire) named "Nieh-ku-lun". In September 1371, he had the man sent back to his native country with a letter announcing the founding of the Ming dynasty to his ruler (i.e. John V Palaiologos). It is speculated that the merchant was actually a former bishop of Khanbaliq (Beijing) called Nicolaus de Bentra, sent by Pope John XXII to replace Archbishop John of Montecorvino in 1333. The History of Ming goes on to explain that contacts between China and Fu lin ceased after this point, and diplomats of the great western sea (the Mediterranean Sea) did not appear in China again until the 16th century, with the Italian Jesuit missionary Matteo Ricci.

Death 

After a 30-year reign, Hongwu died on 24 June 1398, at the age of 69. After his death, his physicians were penalized. He was buried at Xiaoling Mausoleum on the Purple Mountain, in the east of Nanjing. The mass sacrifice of concubines after the emperor's death, a practice long disappeared among Chinese dynasties, was revived by Zhu Yuanzhang, probably to clear potential obstacles to the reign of his chosen successor. At least 38 concubines were killed as part of Hongwu's funeral human sacrifice.

Assessment 
Historians consider Hongwu as one of the most significant emperors of China. As Patricia Buckley Ebrey puts it, "Seldom has the course of Chinese history been influenced by a single personality as much as it was by the founder of the Ming dynasty, Zhu Yuanzhang." His rise to power was fast despite his having a poor and humble origin. In 11 years, he went from being a penniless monk to the most powerful warlord in China. Five years later, he became emperor of China. Simon Leys described him this way: 'an adventurer from peasant stock, poorly educated, a man of action, a bold and shrewd tactician, a visionary mind, in many respects a creative genius; naturally coarse, cynical, and ruthless, he eventually showed symptoms of paranoia, bordering on psychopathy.'

Family

Zhu Yuanzhang had many Korean and Mongolian women among his concubines along with his Empress Ma and had 16 daughters and 26 sons with all of them.

Consorts and Issue:
 Empress Xiaocigao, of the Ma clan (1332–1382), personal name Xiuying 
 Zhu Biao, Crown Prince Yiwen (10 October 1355 – 17 May 1392), first son
 Zhu Shuang, Prince Min of Qin (3 December 1356 – 9 April 1395), second son
 Zhu Gang, Prince Gong of Jin (18 December 1358 – 30 March 1398), third son
 Zhu Di, the Yongle Emperor (2 May 1360 – 12 August 1424), fourth son
 Zhu Su, Prince Ding of Zhou (8 October 1361 – 2 September 1425), fifth son
 Princess Ningguo (1364 – 7 September 1434), second daughter
 Married Mei Yin, Duke Rong (d. 1405) in 1378, and had issue (two sons)
 Princess Anqing, fourth daughter
 Married Ouyang Lun (d. 23 July 1397) on 23 December 1381
 Noble Consort Chengmu, of the Sun clan (1343–1374)
 Princess Lin'an (1360 – 17 August 1421), personal name Yufeng, first daughter
 Married Li Qi (d. 1402), a son of Li Shanchang, in 1376, and had issue (two sons)
 Princess Huaiqing (1366 – 15 July 1425), sixth daughter
 Married Wang Ning, Marquis Yongchun on 11 September 1382, and had issue (two sons)
 Tenth daughter
 Thirteenth daughter
 Noble Consort, of the Jiang clan (貴妃 江氏)
 Noble Consort, of the Zhao clan
 Zhu Mo, Prince Jian of Shen (1 September 1380 – 11 June 1431), 21st son
 Consort Ning, of the Guo clan
 Princess Runing, fifth daughter
 Married Lu Xian on 11 June 1382
 Princess Daming (1368 – 30 March 1426), seventh daughter
 Married Li Jian (d. 1401) on 2 September 1382, and had issue (one son)
 Zhu Tan, Prince Huang of Lu (15 March 1370 – 2 January 1390), tenth son
 Consort Zhaojingchong, of the Hu clan
 Zhu Zhen, Prince Zhao of Chu (5 April 1364 – 22 March 1424), sixth son
 Consort Ding, of the Da clan (d. 1390)
 Zhu Fu, Prince Gong of Qi (23 December 1364 – 1428), seventh son
 Zhu Zi, Prince of Tan (6 October 1369 – 18 April 1390), eighth son
 Consort An, of the Zheng clan
 Princess Fuqing (1370 – 28 February 1417), eighth daughter
 Married Zhang Lin on 26 April 1385, and had issue (one son)
 Consort Hui, of the Guo clan
 Zhu Chun, Prince Xian of Shu (4 April 1371 – 22 March 1423), 11th son
 Zhu Gui, Prince Jian of Dai (25 August 1374 – 29 December 1446), 13th son
 Princess Zhenyi of Yongjia (1376 – 12 October 1455), 12th daughter
 Married Guo Zhen (1372–1399) on 23 November 1389, and had issue (one son)
 Zhu Hui, Prince of Gu (30 April 1379 – 1428), 19th son
 Princess Ruyang, 15th daughter
 Married Xie Da (d. 1404) on 23 August 1394
 Consort Shun, of the Hu clan
 Zhu Bai, Prince Xian of Xiang (12 September 1371 – 18 May 1399), 12th son
 Consort Xian, of the Li clan
 Zhu Jing, Prince Ding of Tang (11 October 1386 – 8 September 1415), 23rd son
 Consort Hui, of the Liu clan
 Zhu Dong, Prince Jing of Ying (21 June 1388 – 14 November 1414), 24th son
 Consort Li, of the Ge clan
 Zhu Yi, Prince Li of Yi (9 July 1388 – 8 October 1414), 25th son
 Prince Zhu Nan (4 January 1394 – February 1394), 26th son
 Consort Zhuangjinganronghui, of the Cui clan
 Consort, of the Han clan. She was an ethnic Korean from Goryeo
 Zhu Zhi, Prince Jian of Liao (24 March 1377 – 4 June 1424), 15th son
 Princess Hanshan (1381 – 18 October 1462), 14th daughter
 Married Yin Qing on 11 September 1394, and had issue (two sons)
 Consort, of the Yu clan
 Zhu Zhan, Prince Jing of Qing (6 February 1378 – 23 August 1438), 16th son
 Consort, of the Yang clan
 Zhu Quan, Prince Xian of Ning (27 May 1378 – 12 October 1448), 17th son
 Consort, of the Zhou clan
 Zhu Pian, Prince Zhuang of Min (9 April 1379 – 10 May 1450), 18th son
 Zhu Song, Prince Xian of Han (20 June 1380 – 19 November 1407), 20th son
 Beauty, of the Zhang clan, personal name Xuanmiao
 Princess Baoqing (1394–1433), 16th daughter
 Married Zhao Hui (1387–1476) in 1413
 Lady, of the Lin clan
 Princess Nankang (1373 – 15 November 1438), personal name Yuhua, 11th daughter
 Married Hu Guan (d. 1403) in 1387, and had issue (one son)
 Lady, of the Gao clan
 Zhu Ying, Prince Zhuang of Su (10 October 1376 – 5 January 1420), 14th son
 Unknown
 Princess Chongning, third daughter
 Married Niu Cheng on 21 December 1384
 Zhu Qi, Prince of Zhao (October 1369 – 16 January 1371), ninth son
 Princess Shouchun (1370 – 1 August 1388), ninth daughter
 Married Fu Zhong (d. 20 December 1394), the first son of Fu Youde, on 9 April 1386, and had issue (one son)
 Zhu Ying, Prince Hui of An (18 October 1383 – 9 October 1417), 22nd son

Ancestry

In popular culture 
 Novels
 The Heaven Sword and Dragon Saber, a 1961–63 wuxia novel by Louis Cha. Zhu Yuanzhang appears as a minor character in the novel. Zhu Yuanzhang has been portrayed by various actors in the films and television series adapted from this novel.
She Who Became the Sun, a 2021 novel by Shelley Parker-Chan. Zhu Yuanzhang and his rise to power is the historical basis of the main character Zhu Chongba, a female villager who disguised as a boy and took on her dead brother's identity in order to survive.

 Television series
 Born to be a King, a 1987 Hong Kong television series produced by TVB and starring Simon Yam as Zhu Yuanzhang.
 Zhu Yuanzhang, a 1993 Chinese television series produced by Beijing TV and starring Lü Qi as Zhu Yuanzhang.
 Empress Ma With Great Feet, a 2002 Chinese television series about Zhu Yuanzhang's wife, Empress Ma. Tang Guoqiang starred as Zhu Yuanzhang.
 Chuanqi Huangdi Zhu Yuanzhang, a 2006 Chinese television series starring Chen Baoguo as Zhu Yuanzhang.
 Founding Emperor of Ming Dynasty, a 2006 Chinese television series directed by Feng Xiaoning and starring Hu Jun as Zhu Yuanzhang.
 The Legendary Liu Bowen, a 2006–2008 Taiwanese television series about Zhu Yuanzhang's adviser, Liu Bowen. It was produced by TTV and starred Huo Zhengqi as Zhu Yuanzhang.
 Zhenming Tianzi, a 2015 Chinese television series produced by Jian Yuanxin and starring Zhang Zhuowen as Zhu Yuanzhang.
 Love Through Different Times, a 2002 Chinese television comedy-drama that is considered the first time-travel television series produced in mainland China.

See also 

 Chinese emperors family tree (late)
 Huang Ming Zu Xun, the "Ancestral Instructions" written by Hongwu to guide his descendants
 Ming Xiaoling Mausoleum
 Rags to riches
 Sino-Tibetan relations during the Ming dynasty
 Hongwu Tongbao

Notes

References

Further reading 

 Brook, Timothy. (1998). The Confusions of Pleasure: Commerce and Culture in Ming China. Berkeley: University of California Press.  (Paperback).

External links 

Ming dynasty emperors
Ming dynasty Buddhists
Chinese Buddhist monarchs
14th-century Chinese monarchs
Medieval legislators
Politicians from Chuzhou
People from Fengyang
History of Nanjing
1328 births
1398 deaths
Burials in Nanjing
Founding monarchs
Red Turban rebels
Chinese reformers